Labill may refer to:

Joseph S. Labill (1837–1911), Union Army Medal of Honor recipient
Labill., taxonomic author abbreviation of Jacques Labillardière (1755–1834), French biologist

See also
Labille, a surname